Bu ol Qalam (also Romanized as Bū ol Qalam; also known as Bolqalam) is a village in Larijan-e Sofla Rural District, Larijan District, Amol County, Mazandaran Province, Iran. At the 2006 census, its population was 149, in 44 families.

References 

Populated places in Amol County